Mark Atkinson may refer to:

Mark N. Atkinson (born 1969), Tasmanian cricketer
Mark P. Atkinson (born 1970), Western Australian cricketer
Mark Atkinson (footballer) (born 1970), New Zealand footballer
Mark Atkinson (scientist) (born 1961), American scientist
Mark Atkinson (rugby union) (born 1990), English rugby union player